State Highway 46 (SH 46) is a State Highway in Kerala, India that starts in Kilimanoor and ends in Alamcode, a junction in Attingal municipal area. The highway is 10.7 km long.

The Route Map 
Kilimanoor central junction.(SH 1 - MC Road) - Nagaroor - Vanchiyoor - Alamcode junction (joins with NH 66-Attingal)

See also 
Roads in Kerala
List of State Highways in Kerala

References 

State Highways in Kerala
Roads in Thiruvananthapuram district